

Debuting and disbanded in 2006

Debuting groups

2NB
Battle
Big Bang
Brown Eyed Girls
DickPunks
Eluphant
Girl Friends
SeeYa
Super Junior-K.R.Y.
Typhoon
Vanilla Unity

Reformed groups
Uptown

Solo debuts

Ahyoomee
Boom
Brian Joo
Crown J
Ha Dong-kyun
H-Eugene
Kan Mi-youn
Kim Jeong-hoon
Kim Tae-woo
Lee Joon-gi
Park Jung-ah
Primary
Son Ho-young
Sunmin
Sunwoo Jung-a

Disbanded groups

Baby V.O.X.
Chakra
NRG
Sugar

Releases in 2006

First quarter

January

February

March

Second quarter

April

May

June

Third quarter

July

August

September

Fourth quarter

October

November

December

See also
2006 in South Korea
List of South Korean films of 2006

 
South Korean music
K-pop